Haris Safwan Kamal (born 8 June 1982) is a former Malaysian footballer who last played as a forward for Hanelang. Haris Safwan is the former member of Malaysia U-23 team in 2003 until 2005.

Club career
Haris Safwan has played for MPPJ Selangor in the 2013-2004 season and scored 16 goals. Throughout his career, Haris has played with several teams including MPPJ FC, Selangor, UPB-Myteam FC, T-team FC and also was playing for Plus FC on loan. He was part of Selangor team that won treble in 2005 season. He is so far the only Malaysia player to go to a football match with helicopter during semifinal Malaysia Cup 2003 MPPJ Selangor against Perlis at Kangar.

International career
He made 5 appearances during 2003 South East Asian Games in Ho Chi Minh City, Vietnam. Malaysia grabbed the bronze medal in the tournament after beating Myanmar on penalties 4-2. He also part of silver medalist winner in 2008 ASEAN University Games as a captain, held in Kuala Lumpur after being defeated by the team from Thailand (7 goals). He also captain for Malaysia University in World University Games, held in Bangkok, Thailand (2 goals)

Honours

Individual
 Malaysia Premier League: 2007 Golden Boot Winner (13 goals)
 Malaysia Premier League: 2009 Golden Boot Winner (24 goals)

References

External links

 Profile at theredwarriorsfc.com
 Haris Safwan at SoccerPunter.com
 

Malaysian footballers
Living people
1982 births
Association football forwards
People from Terengganu
Kelantan FA players
Perak F.C. players